Chisumbanje is an area in the Province of Manicaland, Zimbabwe. It is situated in Chipinge District, one of the seven districts in Manicaland Province.

Social
Chisumbanje is under Chief Garahwa.
Muchongoyo is a dance popular in Chipinge area and people in Chisumbanje respect this type of dance. Besides entertaining villagers, it is also used as a source of unity and love among the locals. the Teponean society, Topoyak language, Teponism movement and Teponisation is the social identity of the residents of Chitepo Cosmo dated back to 1925.

Climate
The area is arid because it lies in a valley and crop yields are generally poor thus it is prone to food insecurities. It is totally different from the other northern part of Chipinge district which lies in Zimbabwe's region one. Other districts in region one in Manicaland Province, (eastern part of Zimbabwe) include Mutare, Chimanimani, Nyanga and Mutasa .

Population
In terms of population distribution, Chipinge is rural whereas Chisumbanje has a population of about 300 000 people .

Infrastructure 
Chisumbanje is linked by a good tarred road from the Manicaland provincial capital, Mutare, and the district capital, Chipinge town to the Lowveld and to the South African border crossing at Beitbridge. Chitepo Cosmo's great Jack Quinton Bridge crosses Save River to Chiredzi.

Cities and towns
Cities, towns and places near Chisumbanje include Mabhiza, Machona, Vheneka, Chitepo Cosmo, Matikwa, Munepasi and Manzvire. The closest major city is [Mutare]

Economic
Their economy is largely agricultural with the most common crops being maize, millet, rapoko, cotton and sugarcane. It is interesting that it is a taboo to grow millet in Chief Musikavanhu's area. The local varieties of crops contrast sharply with the commercial estates where coffee, tea and bananas are grown. Thanks be to the mineral rich fields of Chitepo Cosmo South East.Chitepo Cosmo is the area rich in gold, coal, zinc, manganese, Iranian and little deposits of platinum.

Ethanol Plant
The Chisumbanje Ethanol Project is a national project of great strategic importance where ethanol is produced from sugarcane. It is seen as one of Africa's largest ethanol projects. The project consists of sugarcane plantations in Chisumbanje and Middle Sabi, with the ethanol plant being located in Chisumbanje. It is also a consortium of local investors in partnership with the government's Agriculture and Rural Development Authority, ARDA.

At its peak, the Chisumbanje ethanol project – and ARDA's cane growing adjacent farms operated by the private investors trading as Rating (at Middle Sabi) and Macdom (at Chisumbanje) – has been projected to create employment for more than 8,000 people, becoming one of the single largest job creation ventures in Zimbabwe in recent years.

Irrigation
World class irrigation infrastructure has been put in place, and an outstanding ethanol producing plant constructed.

Health centres
Chisumbanje area has eight clinics that are run by the Ministry of Health. The Clinics are St Peters, Madhuku, Arda Chisumbanje, Veneka, Mabee, Matandwa, Chisuma, Mutandahwe and Mahenye.

Primary schools
Chisumbanje has about 20 primary schools and 12 secondary schools run by the Ministry of Education.
These are located in the various wards in the Chisumbanje area.

See also
 Manicaland Province
 Save River
 Chipinge District

References

External links
 Website of Zimbabwe Statistics

Chipinge District
Populated places in Manicaland Province